Baker is a city in and the county seat of Fallon County, Montana, United States. The population was 1,802 at the 2020 census.

It was named after A. G. Baker, an engineer with the Chicago, Milwaukee, St. Paul and Pacific Railroad.

History
Baker was built along the transcontinental rail line of the Milwaukee Road near where the railroad created a lake to supply water to its steam locomotives. The city was known as Lorraine for a brief time before being renamed in honor of Milwaukee Road engineer A.G. Baker. A successful Milwaukee Land Company campaign to attract homesteaders to the area allowed the city to grow and serve a large community of dryland farmers. Additional growth occurred following the 1912 discovery of oil and natural gas deposits nearby.

In 2014, Baker was described as "a busy, noisy, traffic-jammed, bursting-at-the-seams boomtown on the edge of the oil fields." On June 11, 2016 an EF-3 Tornado struck Baker destroying several houses and damaging dozens more, killing multiple horses in the area and injuring six people.

Geography
Baker is located at  (46.364817, −104.275089). U.S. Route 12 passes through town.

Sandstone rock is the predominant feature. Nearby Medicine Rocks State Park has many unusual sandstone rock formations.

Demographics

2010 census
As of the census of 2010, there were 1,741 people, 763 households, and 459 families residing in the city. The racial makeup of the city was 97.5% White, 0.1% African American, 0.4% Native American, 0.7% Asian, 0.2% from other races, and 1.2% from two or more races. Hispanic or Latino of any race were 1.3% of the population.

There were 763 households, of which 27.3% had children under the age of 18 living with them, 48.8% were married couples living together, 6.9% had a female householder with no husband present, 4.5% had a male householder with no wife present, and 39.8% were non-families. 34.3% of all households were made up of individuals, and 16.2% had someone living alone who was 65 years of age or older. The average household size was 2.24 and the average family size was 2.89.

The median age in the city was 39.3 years. 23.4% of residents were under the age of 18; 7.5% were between the ages of 18 and 24; 24.4% were from 25 to 44; 27.8% were from 45 to 64; and 16.9% were 65 years of age or older. The gender makeup of the city was 50.6% male and 49.4% female.

2000 census
As of the census of 2000, there were 1,695 people, 694 households, and 455 families residing in the city. The population density was 1,974.8 people per square mile (761.0/km2). There were 855 housing units at an average density of 996.2 per square mile (383.9/km2). The racial makeup of the city was 98.11% White, 0.24% African American, 0.53% Native American, 0.29% Asian, 0.06% Pacific Islander, 0.12% from other races, and 0.65% from two or more races. Hispanic or Latino of any race were 0.24% of the population.

There were 694 households, out of which 32.3% had children under the age of 18 living with them, 53.7% were married couples living together, 7.8% had a female householder with no husband present, and 34.3% were non-families. 30.8% of all households were made up of individuals, and 16.4% had someone living alone who was 65 years of age or older. The average household size was 2.38 and the average family size was 2.98.

In the city, the population was spread out, with 26.8% under the age of 18, 6.3% from 18 to 24, 25.0% from 25 to 44, 22.1% from 45 to 64, and 19.9% who were 65 years of age or older. The median age was 40 years. For every 100 females there were 97.1 males. For every 100 females age 18 and over, there were 88.6 males.

The median income for a household in the city was $30,893, and the median income for a family was $42,375. Males had a median income of $30,667 versus $17,500 for females. The per capita income for the city was $17,461. About 7.7% of families and 10.7% of the population were below the poverty line, including 15.3% of those under age 18 and 6.3% of those age 65 or over.

Climate

According to the Köppen Climate Classification system, Baker has a cold semi-arid climate, abbreviated "BSk" on climate maps.

Transportation
The Baker Municipal Airport is located one nautical mile (1.15 mi, 1.85 km) southeast of Baker's central business district.

Education
Baker Public Schools educates students from kindergarten through 12th grade. Baker High School has an enrollment of 140, which places it in class B within the Montana high school sports system. The school mascot is the 'Spartan'. The Spartans have won 6 State Football Championships under long time coach Don Schillinger.

The Fallon County Library serves the town of Baker.

Media
The Fallon County Times is the local newspaper. It is published weekly.

Local radio
 KFLN AM
 KJJM (FM)

Attractions
O'Fallon Historical Museum is home to the world's largest steer.

Notable people
 Bill Bowman, North Dakota state senator
 Irene Lentz, Hollywood costume designer
 Tyler Lyson, paleontologist (from North Dakota but attended Baker High School)
 Shann Schillinger, NFL player for the Atlanta Falcons
 Jack Westrope, Hall of Fame jockey

See also
List of cities and towns in Montana

References

External links

 Chamber of Commerce page
 Baker schools
 Montana Historical Society

Cities in Fallon County, Montana
County seats in Montana
Cities in Montana